The Hollow Reed was a vegetarian restaurant in the Old Port district of Portland, Maine that opened on February 7, 1974, and closed in 1981, and is cited for its influence on the city's notable restaurant culture.

History 
The restaurant was opened on 334 Fore Street in the Old Port on February 7, 1974, by Victoria Jahn, Bobbi Goodman and Frank LaTorre. The restaurant was situated in a 1790 mariner's building. After a restoration the original brick walls and dark beams were left intact. The Hollow Reed was not a strict vegetarian restaurant as they also served fish and lobster. It closed in 1981.

In 2009, Maine writer Elizabeth Peavey wrote about Portland in the 1980s "when this was a cowboy town — unprettified, unsanitized, still a little dangerous" and said "a trip to the very groovy Hollow Reed in the Old Port was a must.".

In 2011, the editor of Portland magazine, Colin Sargent, wrote about the past 25 years in the city and wrote that 25 years ago "a new wave of restaurants in Portland dazzled diners" and said The Hollow Reed was a "beloved vegetarian restaurant on Fore Street."

In 2018, the chef and owner of Fore Street restaurant, Sam Hayward, told the Portland Press Herald that The Hollow Reed was one of four restaurants from the Old Port's early days that "deserve some of the credit for the city’s current reputation as a culinary destination." In 2019, organic farmer Mort Mather recalled selling to the Hollow Reed, which he called "one of the first quality restaurants in Portland’s Old Port."

References 

1974 establishments in Maine
Restaurants in Portland, Maine
Defunct restaurants in the United States
Restaurants in Maine
Defunct vegetarian restaurants
Vegetarian restaurants in the United States
1981 disestablishments in Maine
Restaurants established in 1974
Restaurants disestablished in 1981